In fire classes, a Class B fire is a fire in flammable liquids or flammable gases, petroleum greases, tars, oils, oil-based paints, solvents, lacquers, or alcohols. For example, propane, natural gas, gasoline and kerosene fires are types of Class B fires.  The use of lighter fluid on a charcoal grill, for example, creates a Class B fire. Some plastics are also Class B fire materials. 

Class B fires are distinguished from the other fire classes: Class A fires ("ordinary combustibles" such as wood, paper, or rubber); Class C fires (in which the burning material is energized electrical equipment) and Class D fires (in which the burning material is combustible metals). The less-commonly-used Class F (known in the United States as Class K) refers to fires involving cooking oil or fat; these materials are technically part of Class B.

Fires are classified by the proper extinguishing agent.  While water is used on Class A fires, using water on a Class B fire (such as a grease fire) is extremely dangerous. This is because Class B fires typically have a fuel with a lower density than water (causing it to rise) and burning grease is hotter than the boiling point of water (212 degrees Fahrenheit or 100 degrees Celsius); when water is placed on grease, it creates steam which expands rapidly and splatters, causing burns and spreading the fire. Because of this, Class A fire extinguishers use water, while Class B fire extinguishers use dry chemicals (foam or powder), such as aqueous film-forming foam, multi-purpose dry chemicals such as ammonium phosphate, and halogenated agents (such as Halon 1301 and Halon 1211)  or highly pressurized carbon dioxide. Some fire extinguishers contain chemicals designed to fight both Class A and Class B fires.

Grease and cooking oil fires pose a greater safety risk. One ten-year study, examining the years 1976 to 1985, found that 4.7% of hospitalized burn patients suffered burns from hot grease or oil, with 78% of such injuries occurring in the home. According to the National Fire Protection Association, between 2010 and 2014, nearly half (46%) of home structure fires reported to fire departments in the United States involved cooking; over the same time period, cooking equipment was implicated in 19% of home fire deaths, 44% of home fire injuries, and 17% of total direct property damage. Grease fires are an object of study in food science.

See also
Grease duct – a duct designed to vent grease-laden flammable vapors to prevent them from building up near the flame of cooking apparatuses
Exhaust hood – a device containing a mechanical fan that for use above the stove or cooktop in the kitchen to remove airborne elements produced by cooking

References

External links

Types of fire